Piria may refer to:

 Piria, a village in the commune Argetoaia, Dolj County, Romania
 Piriá River (Pará River), a tributary of the Pará River in Brazil
 Piriá River (Eastern Pará), a river in the extreme east of the state of Pará, Brazil, that flows into the Atlantic Ocean
 Raffaele Piria, a 19th-century Italian chemist
the Piria reaction of aromatic nitro compounds
 Vicky Piria, an Italian racing driver
 Piria, termine dialettale friulano e bisiaco (Friuli-Venezia Giulia)